love it! is a weekly magazine produced in the UK. It was launched on 7 February 2006 by News Magazines Ltd, News International's magazine division.

Entering into the real life category, it is aimed at working-class women aged 18–35, combining inspirational real-life stories with fashion, beauty, travel, crime, health, reviews, food, competitions and quizzes.

The magazine was heavily promoted by The Sun, News International's daily tabloid newspaper.

Change of ownership
The magazine was sold to Hubert Burda Media in December 2008. It was subsequently bought out by Pep Publishing in 2012, and ACH Publishing in August 2015.

References

External links

2006 establishments in the United Kingdom
Magazines established in 2006
Weekly magazines published in the United Kingdom
Women's magazines published in the United Kingdom